Lofranco is a surname. Notable people with the surname include:
 Eligio Lofranco (born 1943), Filipino lawyer
 Franco Lofranco (born 1969), Canadian soccer player
 Spencer Lofranco (born 1992), Canadian actor